Karma (カルマ) is the tenth full-length album by  Mucc, released on October 6, 2010. It features a variety of genres "mixing the best of many worlds while keeping the sound their own." The album reached number 11 on the Oricon chart. Tracks 2 & 3 were arranged by Miya and Space Walkers, while track 14 was arranged by Miya and Ken from L'Arc-en-Ciel.

Musical style
Karma mixes post-disco and dance with Mucc's usual metal sound.

Track listing

Cover 
"I Am Computer" was covered by Polysics respectively, on the 2017 Mucc tribute album Tribute Of Mucc -en-.

References

2010 albums
Mucc albums